Isaac Alston was a reverend and state legislator in North Carolina. He represented Warren County, North Carolina in the North Carolina Senate in 1870 and 1891. He lived in Warrenton, North Carolina. He was the only African American elected to the North Carolina Senate in 1890. Three African Americans were elected to the North Carolina House of Representatives that year.

In the legislature in 1891 he proposed establishing a college in North Carolina for African Americans. His  photograph is included in a montage of 1891 North Carolina State senators. He was a Baptist.

See also
African-American officeholders during and following the Reconstruction era
List of first African-American U.S. state legislators

References

Members of the North Carolina House of Representatives
People from Warren County, North Carolina
Year of birth missing